Vel Lewis (legal name is Velbert Lewis, Jr.) is an American contemporary jazz musician born on November 30, 1954, in Philadelphia, Pennsylvania. His primary instrument of choice is the Hammond organ; however he also plays piano, synthesizer keyboards, drums, and electric bass guitar.
 
He began his music career in 1965 as a 1st soprano vocalist with the Philadelphia All-Boys Choir under the direction of Dr. Carlton J. Lake. He attended Settlement Music School for vocal/piano training. He also began studies on concert flute. In 1966, he switched from flute to organ, and advanced to 1st soprano soloist in the Philadelphia All-Boys Choir Small Ensemble group. In 1967, he traveled with the Philadelphia All-Boys Choir Small Ensemble to Montreal, Canada and appeared at Expo ’67 as lead soloist. In 1968, he continued organ studies on the Hammond organ with Mr. Milton Myers, then with Dr. E. Woodley Kalehoff, Sr., White House pianist to U.S. President Harry Truman in 1969 for three years. He attended Overbrook High School between 1969 and 1972. During these years, he performed on a televised jazz program playing organ with drummer Gerry Brown and bassist John Lee, and recorded Hammond organ on gospel recording sessions for ABC's Peacock Record label with producer Ira Tucker, Sr. for albums by groups known as The Sensational Nightingales, The Gospelaires, and The Dixie Hummingbirds. In 1972, he was under recording contract with Philadelphia International Records, performing with a vocal group known as "The Futures". The group was known for their single, "Love Is Here".

In 1973, he performed and traveled with another vocal group known as "The Delfonics" and co-wrote and sang the opening lead vocal on a song released in 1974 on the Warner Bros. Reprise label entitled "Tell Me Why" by The Life Group, also known as "Life".
In 1990, he co-produced songs with Tom Borton on Borton's albums "Dancing With Tigers" and "The Lost World", released on the Mesa/Bluemoon Records label.

In 1995, he began composing music as a songwriter for Los Angeles Post Music, a production music library founded by Tom Borton. LA Post Music's tracks appear on popular TV shows "Sex And The City", "Friends", "Mad About You", and "The Fresh Prince of Bel-Air". Between the years 2003 through 2005, he performed on a World Tour with legendary singer Dionne Warwick. In 2005, he released his first solo debut album "All Wound Up" under the stage name of Shady Grady. He composed eight of the ten songs and co-wrote the remaining two songs contained in this album.
His song "Song For My Love" from his EP "Colors Of Soul" landed at #67 on the Groove Jazz Music "Top 100" list for 2014 with over 1,600 spins and 375,000 streams.

Awards

 Selected as official artist of Hammond Organ Company USA
 2013: ASCAP Plus Award recipient (ASCAP), American Society of Composers & Publishers
 2014: ASCAP Plus Award recipient (ASCAP), American Society of Composers & Publishers
 2015: The Recording Academy (NARAS) Appreciation and Recognition Award of 10 Years

Discography
 2005: "All Wound Up" by Shady Grady (Celebrity Status Entertainment Cat. #02097 00742; Writer/Composer, arranger, session musician, Executive Producer)
 2012: "Vitamin D" (Velbert Lewis)
 2013: "Maybe So" (Velbert Lewis)
 2014: "Song For My Love" (Velbert Lewis)
 2014: "Colors Of Soul" ( Velbert Lewis)
 2014: "God Rest Ye Merry Gentlemen"(Velbert Lewis)
 2015: "I Wanna Be Cool" (Velbert Lewis, released April 14, 2015)
 2016 "Papa's Strut" (Velbert Lewis)
 2018 "Houston Strong" (Velbert Lewis)

Compilation appearance
2005: "After Hours Vol.3 – More Northern Soul Masters from the vaults of Atlantic, Atco, Loma, Reprise & Warner Bros. Records 1965-1974 [VINYL]" (Compilation album – Warner Strategic Marketing #B0006Q2TU2)
2007: "Keepin It Mellow" (Compilation album – Soulvibe Recordings/Pinnacle Records Cat. # SVC04)
2011: "After Hours: The Collection – Northern Soul Masters" (Compilation album – Warner Brothers UK #B0058OACT2)

Songs co-written
 "Tell Me Why" (with Keith Stafford): 45 RPM single by Life (Reprise Records, #REP1185).
 "Soul Central", "Swingopolis", "Cellophane Man" (with Tom Borton): Album entitled "The Lost World" (Mesa/Bluemoon Records Cat. #R2 79175; Co-producer, Co-writer, session musician).
 "The Magic Hour" (with Tom Borton): Album entitled "The Magic Hour" by Steve Allee (Noteworthy Records Cat. #NWR 9504; Co-writer, session musician).
 "Let It Ride", "Midnight Dreams", "Sunshine" (with Tyrone Peterson, Juanita, Dickens, Chaka Blackmon, Anson Dawkins): Album entitled "All Wound Up" by Shady Grady, "Keepin’ It Mellow" compilation album

References

 Poole, Denis. "Spotlight on Vel Lewis" Smooth Jazz Therapy. Retrieved June 20, 2015
 Hulsman, Hans-Bernd. "Vel Lewis Colors Of Soul" Smooth Jazz Daily. Retrieved June 20, 2015
 Hennessey, Trish. "Hybrid Jazz from Trish Hennessey – with Multi-talented Vel Lewis" Retrieved June 20, 2015
 Jazz Lynx. "Fresh Trax: Part One" Jazz Lynx & Café Jazz Radio "Canada's Smooth Jazz Connection" Retrieved June 20, 2015.
 Craver, David. "Vel Lewis as Shady Grady" Open Mic.US. Retrieved June 20, 2015
 M, Mr. "Michel's Notes" Various Artists – Keepin' It Mellow. Retrieved June 20, 2015
 Yamaha Corporation. "Yamaha Artists – Drums, Gerry Brown biography" Retrieved June 20, 2015
 Banks, Andy. "Groove Jazz Music Top 100 of 2014 Groove Jazz Music. Retrieved June 20, 2015
 Tom W. Borton, obituary
 All Music. "The Lost World  All Music. Retrieved June 20, 2015
 All Music. "Dancing With Tigers" All Music. Retrieved June 20, 2015

External links
 
 Hammond Organ Company USA website
 Max Bernard Management website

1954 births
Living people
American jazz organists
American male organists
Smooth jazz musicians
American multi-instrumentalists
21st-century organists
21st-century American male musicians
American male jazz musicians
21st-century American keyboardists